Will Studd is an international cheese specialist. Studd has been working with artisan and farmhouse cheeses for more than four decades and has traveled extensively in his vocation. During that time, he has done much to promote a greater understanding of what good cheese is all about, and championed the cause of traditional cheeses made from raw milk.  After establishing a chain of delicatessens in central London during the 1970s, he migrated to Melbourne, Australia, in 1982, where he has done much to promote a greater understanding of specialist cheese as well as championing the cause of traditional cheese made from raw milk. His work has included being a distributor, retailer, media commentator, and author of a prize-winning book.

The Roquefort case
In January 2002, Studd challenged minor changes to Australian food regulations relating to raw milk cheese by importing 80 kilograms of Roquefort as a test case.

After the Imported Food Inspection Program (IFIP) refused to test the cheese for compliance, Studd appealed to the Administrative Appeals Tribunal. It took 21 months before the court reached a decision, but during the delay Food Standards Australia New Zealand (FSANZ) changed the dairy regulations to allow the production and sale of hard-cooked cheeses made from raw milk. (Amendment P 296)

The court upheld the ban on Roquefort and it was subsequently buried in a public tip. Two years later FSANZ also granted a special exemption for the sale of Roquefort in Australia (Amendment A 499) after an 11-year ban.

Studd lodged applications with FSANZ for similar exemptions for the production and sale of all European raw milk cheese in 2004 (A530/5310). After a delay of five years, FSANZ finally announced a review of the domestic regulations on the production and sale of raw milk cheese in Australia in 2009 (P1007)

In 2008, the New Zealand Food Safety Authority (NZFSA) allowed the sale of Roquefort on the basis of the Australian report (A499). The following year they announced proposals to change the regulations on the production and sale of raw milk cheese in New Zealand, and proposals to recognise European regulations for some cheese types.

International awards
Hall of Fame Le Cordon Bleu World Food Media Awards 
2009 – Officier of the Ordre National du Mérite Agricole by the French Ministry of Agriculture 
2017- Delicious Produce Awards Outstanding Innovation Award

Books
Studd has published two books, Chalk and Cheese (1999) and Cheese Slices (2007), both of which have been recognized by cheese specialists around the world as valuable guides to understanding cheese.  ‘Chalk and Cheese’ won Best Book on Cheese at the 2009 World Cookbook Fair Awards, Best in the World in France.
In 2015 he also collaborated with Bob Hart and Dean Cambray in Melt!  ] another cheese-related book.

'Will Studd Selected' Cheese Range 

In recent years, he has created a 'Selected by Will Studd' range of benchmark cheeses, each one carefully chosen for its provenance, texture, aroma and flavour. These are available in Australia and the USA.

Television Series
Since 2002, Studd has been an executive producer and presenter of 'Cheese Slices', the world's only television series focused on international artisan and traditional handmade cheeses filmed in two dozen countries. 'Cheese Slices' was conceived by Will Studd and Producer/Director/Editor Michael Ross Robinson of Squid Ink Media.

This International TV series explores the fascinating history, skills and traditions behind some of the world's most significant traditional cheeses. The 61 episodes has aired in many countries and aired in nine languages. It has been aired on channels including Lifestyle Food in Australia and are also available on a series of four DVDs and online, Foxtel, SBSFood, ABC (Australian Broadcasting Commercial) and the AWE channel USA. 

CHEESE SLICES Series 1–8, EPISODES 1-62

Series 1:
Episode 1: Gorgonzola / Cave Ripened Tallegio
Episode 2: Goats Cheese of Poitou – France
Episode 3: Parmigiano Reggiano / Grana Padano
Episode 4: Pecorino
Episode 5: Camembert (Camembert de Normandie)
Episode 6: Cheddar (English Cheddar)

Series 2:
Episode 7: Comte Gruyere and Farmhouse Morbier 
Episode 8: The Irish Farmhouse Revolution
Episode 9: The Legend of Roquefort 
Episode 10: Spanish traditional Quesos
Episode 11: Australian Cheese Pioneers 
Episode 12: Stilton - The King of English Cheese 
Episode 13: Vermont Cheese USA

Series 3:
Episode 14. GREECE – Feta: Food of the Gods 
Episode 15. THE BASQUE - Ossau Iraty Cheese
Episode 16. FRANCE – Massif Central and Auvergne 
Episode 17. FRANCE – Soft Washed Rind Cheeses 
Episode 18. SAVOIE/FRANCHE COMTE - Cheeses of the Alps
Episode 19. SWITZERLAND – Mountain Cheese 
Episode 20. THE NETHERLANDS
Episode 21. USA – New Farmstead Cheeses of Northern California

Series 4:
Episode 22. The Champion of English Cheese
Episode 23. Twins of the Mediterranean – Corsica and Sardinia
Episode 24. Mozzarella and the cheeses of Campania Italy
Episode 25. Cheeses of Quebec
Episode 26. Wisconsin USA
Episode 27. Portugal
Episode 28. Japan
Episode 29. Artisan Cheese of USA
Episode 30. Haloumi – Cyprus
Episode 31. Japan – Special

Series 5:
Episode 32: Cheeses of Norway
Episode 33: Cheeses of Sicily
Episode 34: Cheeses of Denmark
Episode 35: Cheeses of Scotland
Episode 36: Cheeses of Piemonte, Italy
Episode 37: Cheeses of Wales
Episode 38: Cheeses of Tasmania
Episode 39: Cheeses of Provence
Episode 40: Cheeses of Germany

Series 6:
Episode 41: India 
Episode 42: Israel
Episode 43: Bhutan 
Episode 44: Turkey
Episode 45: French monks
Episode 46: Italian Alps
Episode 47: French Butter
Episode 48: Catalonia Menorca

Series 7: 
Episode 49: Cheeses of Galicia, Spain
Episode 50: Cheeses of Brazil 
Episode 51: Cheeses of British Columbia, Canada
Episode 52: Cheeses of Washington State, USA
Episode 53: Cheeses of Sweden
Episode 54: Cheeses of Abruzzo, Italy
Episode 55: Cheeses of Lyon, France

Series 8: 
Episode 56: Cheddar Cheese of England
Episode 57: The Battle of real Camembert, France
Episode 58: Traditional Shepard's Cheeses of the Pyrenees
Episode 59: Cheese of La Mancha and Cabrales, Spain
Episode 60: The Cheese Makers of Vermont, USA
Episode 61: Roquefort Revisiting the King of blues

Gourmet Traveller 
Studd has contributed to one of Australia's leading food magazines for over 17 years on Gourmet Traveller

Other Television Work 

Studd was a guest judge on MasterChef on Network Ten's and multiple appearances as on What's Cooking? (Australia TV series).

Family

Ellie Studd and Sam Studd aka 'The Studd Siblings' are the youngest of Will's three children. Over the last decade, they have separately traveled Australia and the world, working with celebrated mongers and makers; learning to make, mature and sell cheese. Both Ellie and Sam are now members of the esteemed International Guilde Des Fromagers. These days, they spend their time hand-selecting artisan cheeses alongside Will for the ‘Selected by Will Studd’ range, and working tirelessly to share these cheeses with the US and Australian markets. His eldest daughter Fleur Studd co-founded Melbourne Coffee Merchants and Market Lane Coffee in partnership with her father, which helped to drastically influenced the coffee scene in Australia.

See also

 List of cheesemakers

References

External links
 willstudd.com 

Year of birth missing (living people)
Living people
Officers of the Order of Agricultural Merit
Knights of the Order of Agricultural Merit
Cheesemakers
Australian activists
Food activists